Shlomi Yosef Azulay (born 30 March 1990) is an Israeli professional footballer who plays as a central midfielder for Hapoel Tel Aviv.

Career
Azulay began his career in the youth teams of Maccabi Haifa. In 2009, he joined Maccabi Haifa's senior team but was loaned to Hapoel Petah Tikva in 2010 before he could debut in Maccabi Haifa. On 31 October 2010, he made his debut in the Israeli Premier League after coming on as a substitute in the 89th minute in a 1–0 loss to his former team, Maccabi Haifa.

After not playing much in Petah Tikva, he was loaned to Hapoel Herzliya from the second division and until the end of the season he scored three goals in 13 appearances and helped the team stay in the league. The next season, he scored five goals in 32 appearances, at the end of the season Hapoel Herzliya was relegated to the third division

In the summer of 2012, with the end of his contract, Azulay was released from Maccabi Haifa and signed for the local rival, Hapoel Haifa but only played five matches in the 2012–13 season. In 2013, he signed for Hapoel Rishon LeZion from the second division, he scored 10 goals in 31 appearances and was the team's top scorer in the 2013–14 season.

On 21 July 2014, Azulay signed a one-year contract with F.C. Beitar Jerusalem. On 22 September 2014, he scored his first goal in the Israeli Premier League, in a 1–0 victory over Maccabi Haifa. Overall, he scored four goals in 34 appearances.

Maccabi Tel Aviv
On 10 August 2015, Azulay signed a four-year contract with Maccabi Tel Aviv. On 15 August, he made his debut in Maccabi during the Super Cup match after coming on as a substitute in the 67th minute, Maccabi lost 5–4 to Ironi Kiryat Shmona after a penalty shootout.

On 7 September 2016, he moved on loan to Ironi Kiryat Shmona.

Maccabi Haifa
On 29 August 2017, Azulay signed a two-year contract with his former club Maccabi Haifa.

References

External links
 
 

1990 births
Living people
Israeli footballers
Hapoel Petah Tikva F.C. players
Hapoel Herzliya F.C. players
Hapoel Haifa F.C. players
Hapoel Rishon LeZion F.C. players
Beitar Jerusalem F.C. players
Maccabi Tel Aviv F.C. players
Hapoel Ironi Kiryat Shmona F.C. players
Maccabi Haifa F.C. players
F.C. Ashdod players
Hapoel Tel Aviv F.C. players
Israeli Premier League players
Liga Leumit players
Footballers from Hadera
Association football midfielders